(born May 30, 1987 in Waterville, Maine)  is an American professional pool player. Dechaine began playing pool aged 11, representing the USA on four occasions at the Mosconi Cup.

Titles 
 2018 Super Billiards Expo Players Championship
 2017 Gotham City Pro 9-Ball Classic 
 2012 Turning Stone Classic
 2011 Ultimate 10-Ball Championship 
 2009 World Summit of Pool

References

External links

1987 births
Living people
People from Waterville, Maine
American pool players